Hara Pattanaik (12 October 1958 – 13 January 2015), also known as Hari Patnaik, was an Indian actor, director and screenplay writer known for his works in Odia cinema. He has acted over 60 Odia-language movies and directed about 19 others. Pattanaik was instrumental in introducing other actors including Anubhav Mohanty, Sabyasachi Mishra and Babushaan. He died of cancer on 13 January 2015.

Awards and accreditation
During his 20 years tenure, he got several state-level awards and accreditation from media and Oriya cine public at large.

Filmography
As Actor

 Jivan Sangram (1984) (his first movie as actor)
 Sahari Bagha (1985)
 Jor Jaar Mulak Tar (1986)
 Suna Chadhei (1987)
 Chaka Aakhi Sabu Dekhuchi (1987)
 Jahaku Rakhibe Ananta (1988)
 Asuchi Mo Kalia Suna (1989)
 Daiba Daudi (1990)
 Kapala Likhana (1991)
 Ghara Mora Swarga (1992)
 Panjuri Bhitare Sari(1992)
 Anti Churi Tanti Kate (1992)
 Baadshah (1992)
 Rakhile Siba Mariba Kie (1994)
 suna panjuri (1995) 
 Suhaga Sindura (1996)
 Ram Laxman (1997)
 Nari Bi Pindhipare Rakta Sindura (1997)
 Ganga Jamuna (1997)
 Stree (1998)
 Sahara Jaluchi (1998)
 Aie Sangharsha (1998)
 Paradesi Babu (1999)
 Katha Kahiba Mo Matha Sindoor (1999)
 Kalki Abatar (1999)
 Kala Chakra (1999)
 Mo Kola To Jhulana (2001)
 Dharma Debata (2001)
 Sindura Nuhein Khela Ghara (2002)
 Je Panche Para Manda (2003)
 Saathire (2004)
 Barsa My Darling (2004)
 Mastaan (2005)
 Arjun (2005)
 Agni Parikshya (2005)
 Thank You Bhagban (2006)
 Tulkalam (2007)
 Pagala Premi (2007)
 Chaati Chiri Dele Tu.. (2008)
 Mr. Funtoosh (2008)
 Kurukshetra (2009)
 To Akhire Mun (2010)
 Omm Sai Ram (2012)

As Director

 Daiba Daudi (1990)
 Kapala Likhana (1991)
 Bhagya Hate Dori (1993)
 Yashoda (1996)
 Suhaga Sindura (1996)
 Pua Mora Bhola Sankara (1996)
 Nari Bi Pindhipare Rakta Sindura (1997)
 Ganga Jamuna (1997)
 Paradesi Babu (1999)
 Kalki Abatar (1999)
 Ae Jugara Krushna Sudama (2003)
 Saathire (2004)
 Barsa My Darling (2004)
 I Love You (2004)
 Arjun (2005)
 Thank You Bhagban (2006)
 Pagala Premi (2007)
 Romeo – The Lover Boy (2009)
 Omm Sai Ram (2012)

References

External links

 

1958 births
2015 deaths
Male actors in Odia cinema
Odia film directors
Male actors from Odisha
20th-century Indian male actors
21st-century Indian male actors
Place of death missing
20th-century Indian film directors
21st-century Indian film directors
Film directors from Odisha